Modern Hebrew grammar is partly analytic, expressing such forms as dative, ablative, and accusative using prepositional particles rather than morphological cases.

On the other hand, Modern Hebrew grammar is also fusional synthetic: inflection plays a role in the formation of verbs and nouns (using non-concatenative discontinuous morphemes realised by vowel transfixation) and the declension of prepositions (i.e. with pronominal suffixes).

Representation of Hebrew examples
Examples of Hebrew here are represented using the International Phonetic Alphabet (IPA) as well as native script. Although most speakers collapse the phonemes  into , the distinction is maintained by a limited number of speakers and will therefore be indicated here for maximum coverage. In the transcriptions,  is used for the rhotic, which in Modern Hebrew phonology is more commonly a lax voiced uvular approximant .

Hebrew is written from right to left.

Syntax
Every Hebrew sentence must contain at least one subject, at least one predicate, usually but not always a verb, and possibly other arguments and complements.

Word order in Modern Hebrew is somewhat similar to that in English: as opposed to Biblical Hebrew, where the word order is Verb-Subject-Object, the usual word order in Modern Hebrew is Subject-Verb-Object. Thus, if there is no case marking, one can resort to the word order. Modern Hebrew is characterized by an asymmetry between definite Objects and indefinite Objects. There is an accusative marker, et, only before a definite Object (mostly a definite noun or personal name). Et-ha is currently undergoing fusion and reduction to become ta. Consider ten li et ha-séfer "give:2ndPerson.Masculine.Singular.Imperative to-me ACCUSATIVE the-book" (i.e. "Give me the book"), where et, albeit syntactically a case-marker, is a preposition and ha is a definite article. This sentence is realised phonetically as ten li ta-séfer.

Sentences with finite verbs
In sentences where the predicate is a verb, the word order is usually subject–verb–object (SVO), as in English. However, word order can change in the following instances:
 An object can typically be topicalized by moving it to the front of the sentence. When the object is a question word, this topicalization is almost mandatory. Example :  , literally "To-whom he-told?", means "Whom did he tell?" In other cases, this topicalization can be used for emphasis.
 Hebrew is a partly pro-drop language. This means that subject pronouns are sometimes omitted when verb conjugations are able to reflect gender, number, and person; othewise the subject pronouns should be mentioned. Specifically, subject pronouns are always used with verbs in the present tense because present forms of verbs don't reflect person.
 Indefinite subjects (like English's a boy, a book, and so on) are often postponed, giving the sentence some of the sense of "there exists [subject]" in addition to the verb's normal meaning. For example, literally "Turned to-me some man that-asked that-[I]-will-help to-him with something", means "A man came to me wanting me to help him with something." This serves a purpose somewhat analogous to English's narrative use of this with a semantically indefinite subject: "So, I'm at work, and this man comes up to me and asks me to help him." Indeed, outside of the present tense, mere existence is expressed using the verb to be with a postponed indefinite subject. Example:  , literally "Was reason that-[I]-asked", means "There was a reason I asked."
 Definite subjects can be postponed for a number of reasons.
 In some cases, a postponed subject can be used to sound formal or archaic. This is because historically, Hebrew was typically verb–subject–object (VSO). The Bible and other religious texts are predominantly written in VSO word order.
 Sometimes, postponing a subject can give it emphasis.

Generally, Hebrew marks every noun in a sentence with some sort of preposition, with the exception of subjects and semantically indefinite direct objects. Unlike English, indirect objects require prepositions (Hebrew "" /hu naˈtan li ʔet ha-kaˈdur/ (literally "he gave to-me direct-object-marker the ball) in contrast to English "He gave me the ball") and semantically definite direct objects are introduced by the preposition   (Hebrew "" /hu naˈtan li ʔet ha-kaˈdur/ (literally "he gave to-me direct-object-marker the ball) in contrast to English "He gave me the ball").

Nominal sentences
Hebrew also produces sentences where the predicate is not a finite verb. A sentence of this type is called  , a nominal sentence. These sentences contain a subject, a non-verbal predicate, and an optional copula. Types of copulae include:
 The verb   (to be):
While the verb to be does have present-tense forms, they are used only in exceptional circumstances. The following structures are used instead:
While the past and future tenses follow the structure [sometimes-optional subject]-[form of to be]-[noun complement] (analogous to English, except that in English the subject is always mandatory), the present tense follows [optional subject]-[subject pronoun]-[noun complement].
אַבָּא שֶׁלִּי הָיָה שׁוֹטֵר בִּצְעִירוּתוֹ.  (my father was a policeman when he was young.)
הַבֵּן שֶׁלּוֹ הוּא אַבָּא שֶׁלָּהּ.  (literally "the-son of-his he the-father of-hers", his son is her father.)
יוֹסִי יִהְיֶה כִימָאִי.  (Yossi will be a chemist)
While לֹא  ("not") precedes the copula in the past and future tenses, it follows the copula (a subject pronoun) in the present tense.
Where the past and future tenses are structured as [optional subject]-[form of to be]-[adjective complement] (analogous to English, except that in English the subject is mandatory), the present tense is simply [subject]-[adjective complement]. For example, הַדֶּלֶת סְגוּרָה , literally "the-door closed", means "the door is closed." That said, additional subject pronouns are sometimes used, as with noun complements, especially with complicated subjects. Example: זֶה מוּזָר שֶׁהוּא אָמַר כָּךְ , literally " it strange that-he said thus", means "that he said that is strange," i.e. "it's strange that he said that."
 The verbs הָפַךְ , נֶהֱפַךְ  and נִהְיָה  (to become):
When the sentence implies progression or change, the said verbs are used and considered copulae between the nominal subject and the non-verbal predicate. For instance:
הַכֶּלֶב נִהְיָה עַצְבָּנִי יוֹתֵר מֵרֶגַע לְרֶגַע  (The dog became more angry with every passing moment)
הֶחָבֵר שֶׁלִּי נֶהֱפַךְ לְמִפְלֶצֶת!  (My friend has become a monster!)
 Possession / existence: יש/אין :
Possession in Hebrew is constructed indefinitely. There is no Hebrew translation to the English verb "to have," common in many Indo-European languages to express possession as well as to serve as a helping verb. To express the English sentence "I have a dog" in Hebrew is "יֵשׁ לִי כֶּלֶב",ˈ/jeːʃ ˈliː ˈkelev/, literally meaning "there exists to me a dog." The word יֵשׁ  expresses existence in the present tense, and is unique in the Hebrew language as a verb-like form with no inflected qualities at all. Dispossession in the present tense in Hebrew is expressed with the antithesis to יש, which is אֵין  – "אֵין לִי כֶּלֶב"  means "I do not have a dog." Possession in the past and the future in Hebrew is also expressed impersonally, but uses conjugated forms of the Hebrew copula, לִהְיוֹת [lihyot]. For example, the same sentence "I do not have a dog" would in the past tense become "לֹא הָיָה לִי כֶּלֶב" , literally meaning "there was not to me a dog."

Sentence types
Sentences are generally divided into three types:

Simple sentence
A simple sentence is a sentence that contains one subject, one verb, and optional objects. As the name implies, it is the simplest type of sentence.

Compound sentences
Two or more sentences that do not share common parts and can be separated by comma are called מִשְפָּט מְחֻבָּר /miʃˈpat meħuˈbar/, a compound sentence. In many cases, the second sentence uses a pronoun that stands for the other's subject; they are generally interconnected. The two sentences are linked with a coordinating conjunction (מִלַּת חִבּוּר ). The conjunction is a stand-alone word that serves as a connection between both parts of the sentence, belonging to neither part.
 לֹא אָכַלְתִּי כָּל הַיּוֹם, וְלָכֵן בְּסוֹף הַיּוֹם הָיִיתִי מוּתָשׁ.  (I haven't eaten all day, therefore at the end of the day I was exhausted.)
Both parts of the sentence can be separated by a period and stand alone as grammatically correct sentences, which makes the sentence a compound sentence (and not a complex sentence):
לֹא אָכַלְתִּי כָּל הַיּוֹם. בְּסוֹף הַיּוֹם הָיִיתִי מוּתָשׁ.  (I haven't eaten all day. By the end of the day I was exhausted.)

Complex sentences
Like English, Hebrew allows clauses, פְּסוּקִיּוֹת  (sing. פְּסוּקִית ), to serve as parts of a sentence. A sentence containing a subordinate clause is called משפט מרכב , or a complex sentence. Subordinate clauses almost always begin with the subordinating conjunction -ש  (usually that), which attaches as a prefix to the word that follows it. For example, in the sentence יוֹסִי אוֹמֵר שֶׁהוּא אוֹכֵל  (Yossi says that he is eating), the subordinate clause שֶׁהוּא אוֹכֵל  (that he is eating) serves as the direct object of the verb אוֹמֵר  (says). Unlike English, Hebrew does not have a large number of subordinating conjunctions; rather, subordinate clauses almost always act as nouns and can be introduced by prepositions in order to serve as adverbs. For example, the English As I said, there's nothing we can do in Hebrew is כְּפִי שֶׁאָמַרְתִּי, אֵין מָה לַעֲשׂוֹת  (literally As that-I-said, there-isn't what to-do).

That said, relative clauses, which act as adjectives, are also formed using -ֶׁש . For example, English Yosi sees the man who is eating apples is in Hebrew יוֹסִי רוֹאֶה אֶת הָאִישׁ שֶׁאוֹכֵל תַּפּוּחִים  (literally Yosi sees [et] the-man that-eats apples). In this use ש  sometimes acts as a relativizer rather than as a relative pronoun; that is, sometimes the pronoun remains behind in the clause: הִיא מַכִּירָה אֶת הָאִישׁ שֶׁדִּבַּרְתִּי עָלָיו , which translates to She knows the man I talked about, literally means She knows [et] the-man that-I-talked about him. This is because in Hebrew, a preposition (in this case על ) cannot appear without its object, so the him יו- could not be dropped. However, some sentences, such as the above example, can be written both with relativizers and with relative pronouns. The sentence can also be rearranged into הִיא מַכִּירָה אֶת הָאִישׁ עָלָיו דִבַּרְתִּי , literally She knows [et] the-man about him I-talked., and translates into the same meaning. In that example, the preposition and its object עָלָיו  also act as a relative pronoun, without use of -ֶׁש .

Impersonal sentences
A sentence may lack a determinate subject, then it is called מִשְפָּט סְתָמִי , an indefinite or impersonal sentence. These are used in order to put emphasis on the action, and not on the agent of the action. Usually the verb is of the 3rd person plural form.
 עָשׂוּ שִׁפּוּץ בַּבִּנְיָן שֶׁלִּי  (literally: they-made a renovation in-the building of-mine; my building was renovated)

Collective sentences
When a sentence contains multiple parts of the same grammatical function and relate to the same part of the sentence, they are called collective parts. They are usually separated with the preposition וְ-  (and), and if there are more than two, they are separated with commas while the last pair with the preposition, as in English. Collective parts can have any grammatical function in the sentence, for instance:
 Subject:

 Predicate:

 Direct object:

 Indirect object:

When a collective part is preceded by a preposition, the preposition must be copied onto all parts of the collective.

Verbs
Hebrew verbs (פועל ) utilize nonconcatenative morphology extensively, meaning they have much more internal structure than most other languages. Every Hebrew verb is formed by casting a three- or four-consonant root (שֹׁרֶשׁ ) into one of seven derived stems called  (בִּנְיָנִים, meaning buildings or constructions; the singular is בִּנְיָן , written henceforth as binyan). Most roots can be cast into more than one binyan, meaning more than one verb can be formed from a typical root. When this is the case, the different verbs are usually related in meaning, typically differing in voice, valency, semantic intensity, aspect, or a combination of these features. The "concept" of the Hebrew verb's meaning is defined by the identity of the triliteral root. The "concept" of the Hebrew verb assumes verbal meaning by taking on vowel-structure as dictated by the binyan's rules.

Conjugation

Each binyan has a certain pattern of conjugation and verbs in the same binyan are conjugated similarly. Conjugation patterns within a binyan alter somewhat depending on certain phonological qualities of the verb's root; the alterations (called גִּזְרָה , meaning "form") are defined by the presence of certain letters composing the root. For example, three-letter roots (triliterals) whose second letter is ו  or י  are so-called hollow or weak roots, losing their second letter in binyan הִפְעִיל , in הֻפְעַל , and in much of פָּעַל . The feature of being conjugated differently because the second root-letter is ו or י is an example of a gizra. These verbs are not strictly irregular verbs, because all Hebrew verbs that possess the same feature of the gizra are conjugated in accordance with the gizra's particular set of rules.

Every verb has a past tense, a present tense, and a future tense, with the present tense doubling as a present participle. Other forms also exist for certain verbs: verbs in five of the binyanim have an imperative mood and an infinitive, verbs in four of the binyanim have gerunds, and verbs in one of the binyanim have a past participle. Finally, a very small number of fixed expressions include verbs in the jussive mood, which is essentially an extension of the imperative into the third person. Except for the infinitive and gerund, these forms are conjugated to reflect the number (singular or plural), person (first, second, or third) and gender (masculine or feminine) of its subject, depending on the form. Modern Hebrew also has an analytic conditional~past-habitual mood expressed with the auxiliary haya.

In listings such as dictionaries, Hebrew verbs are sorted by their third-person masculine singular past tense form. This differs from English verbs, which are identified by their infinitives. (Nonetheless, the Hebrew term for infinitive is shem poʕal, which means verb name.) Further, each of the seven binyanim is identified by the third-person masculine singular past tense form of the root פ-ע-ל (P-ʕ-L, meaning doing, action, etc.) cast into that binyan: פָּעַל , נִפְעַל , פִּעֵל , פֻּעַל , הִפְעִיל , הֻפְעַל , and הִתְפַּעֵל .

Binyan פָּעַל /paʕal/ 
Binyan paʕal, also called binyan קַל or qal  (light), is the most common binyan. Paʕal verbs are in the active voice, and can be either transitive or intransitive. This means that they may or may not take direct objects. Paʕal verbs are never formed from four-letter roots.

Binyan paʕal is the only binyan in which a given root can have both an active and a passive participle. For example, רָצוּי  (desirable) is the passive participle of רָצָה  (want).

Binyan paʕal has the most diverse number of gzarot (pl. of gizra), and the small number of Hebrew verbs that are strictly irregular (about six to ten) are generally considered to be part of the pa'al binyan, as they have some conjugation features similar to paʕal.

Binyan נִפְעַל  
Verbs in binyan nifal are always intransitive, but beyond that there is little restriction on their range of meanings.

The nifal is the passive-voice counterpart of paal. In principle, any transitive paal verb can be rendered passive by taking its root and casting it into nifal. Nonetheless, this is not nifʕals main use, as the passive voice is fairly rare in ordinary Modern Hebrew.

More commonly, it is paals middle- or reflexive-voice counterpart. Ergative verbs in English often translate into Hebrew as a paal–nifal pair. For example, English he broke the plate corresponds to Hebrew הוּא שָׁבַר אֶת הַצַּלַּחַת , using paa'al; but English the plate broke corresponds to Hebrew הַצַּלַּחַת נִשְׁבְּרָה , using nifal. The difference is that in the first case, there is an agent doing the breaking (active), while in the second case, the agent is ignored (although the object is acted upon; passive). (Nonetheless, as in English, it can still be made clear that there was an ultimate agent: הוּא הִפִּיל אֶת הַצַּלַּחַת וְהִיא נִשְׁבְּרָה , he dropped the plate and it broke, uses nif'al.) Other examples of this kind include פָּתַח /נִפְתַּח  (to open, transitive/intransitive) and גָּמַר /נִגְמַר  (to end, transitive/intransitive).

Other relationships between a paa'al verb and its nifa'al counterpart can exist as well. One example is זָכַר  and נִזְכַּר : both mean to remember, but the latter implies that one had previously forgotten, rather like English to suddenly remember. Another is פָּגַשׁ  and נִפְגַּשׁ : both mean to meet, but the latter implies an intentional meeting, while the former often means an accidental meeting.

Finally, sometimes a nifal verb has no pa'al counterpart, or at least is much more common than its paʕal counterpart; נִדְבַּק  (to stick, intransitive) is a fairly common verb, but דָּבַק  (to cling) is all but non-existent by comparison. (Indeed, נִדְבַּק 's transitive counterpart is הִדְבִּיק , of binyan hifʕil; see below.)

Like pa'al verbs, nifal verbs are never formed from four-letter roots.

Nifal verbs, unlike verbs in the other passive binyanim (pua'al and hufa'al, described below), do have gerunds, infinitives and imperatives.

 Binyan פִּעֵל  
Binyan pi'el, like binyan pa'al, consists of transitive and intransitive verbs in the active voice, though there is perhaps a greater tendency for piʕel verbs to be transitive.

Most roots with a pa'al verb do not have a piʕel verb, and vice versa, but even so, there are many roots that do have both. Sometimes the pi'el verb is a more intense version of the paʕal verb; for example, קִפֵּץ  (to spring) is a more intense version of קָפַץ  (to jump), and שִׁבֵּר  (to smash, to shatter, transitive) is a more intense version of שָׁבַר  (to break, transitive). In other cases, a piʕel verb acts as a causative counterpart to the pa'al verb with the same root; for example, לִמֵּד  (to teach) is essentially the causative of לָמַד  (to learn). And in yet other cases, the nature of the relationship is less obvious; for example, סִפֵּר  means to tell / to narrate or to cut hair, while סָפַר  means to count, and פִּתֵּחַ  means to develop (transitive verb), while פָּתַח  means to open (transitive verb).

 Binyan פֻּעַל  

Binyan puʕal is the passive-voice counterpart of binyan piʕel. Unlike binyan nifʕal, it is used only for the passive voice. It is therefore not very commonly used in ordinary speech, except that the present participles of a number of puʕal verbs are used as ordinary adjectives: מְבֻלְבָּל  means mixed-up (from בֻּלְבַּל , the passive of בִּלְבֵּל , to confuse), מְעֻנְיָן  means interested, מְפֻרְסָם  means famous (from פֻּרְסַם , the passive of פִּרְסֵם , to publicize), and so on. Indeed, the same is true of many piʕel verbs, including the piʕel counterparts of two of the above examples: מְבַלְבֵּל , confusing, and מְעַנְיֵן , interesting. The difference is that piʕel verbs are also frequently used as verbs, whereas puʕal is much less common.

Puʕal verbs do not have gerunds, imperatives, or infinitives.

 Binyan הִפְעִיל  

Binyan hifʕil is another active binyan. Hifʕil verbs are often causative counterparts of verbs in other binyanim; examples include הִכְתִּיב  (to dictate; the causative of כָּתַב , to write), הִדְלִיק  (to turn on (a light), transitive; the causative of נִדְלַק , (for a light) to turn on, intransitive), and הִרְשִׁים  (to impress; the causative of התרשם , to be impressed). Nonetheless, not all are causatives of other verbs; for example, הִבְטִיחַ  (to promise). 

 Binyan הֻפְעַל  

Binyan huf'al is much like binyan pu'al, except that it corresponds to hif'il instead of to pi'el. Like puʕal verbs, hufʕal verbs do not have gerunds, imperatives, or infinitives.

 Binyan הִתְפַּעֵל  

Binyan hitpa'el is rather like binyan nif'al, in that all hitpa'el verbs are intransitive, and most have a reflexive sense. Indeed, many hitpa'el verbs are reflexive counterparts to other verbs with the same root; for example, הִתְרַחֵץ  (to wash oneself) is the reflexive of רָחַץ  (to wash, transitive), and הִתְגַּלֵּחַ  (to shave oneself, i.e. to shave, intransitive) is the reflexive of גִּלֵּחַ  (to shave, transitive). Some hitpaʕel verbs are a combination of causative and reflexive; for example,הִסְתַּפֵּר  (to get one's hair cut) is the causative reflexive of סִפֵּר  (to cut (hair)), and הִצְטַלֵּם  (to get one's picture taken) is the causative reflexive of צִלֵּם  (to take a picture (of someone or something)).

Hitpa'el verbs can also be reciprocal; for example, הִתְכַּתֵּב  (to write to each other, i.e. to correspond) is the reciprocal of כָּתַב  (to write).

In all of the above uses, the hitpa'el verb contrasts with a pu'al or huf'al verb in two ways: firstly, the subject of the hitpa'el verb is generally either performing the action, or at least complicit in it, whereas the subject of the pu'al or huf'al verb is generally not; and secondly, pu'al and huf'al verbs often convey a sense of completeness, which hitpa'el verbs generally do not. So whereas the sentence אֲנִי מְצֻלָּם  (I am photographed, using pu'al) means something like there exists a photo of me, implying that the photo already exists, and not specifying whether the speaker caused the photo to be taken, the sentence אֲנִי מִצְטַלֵּם  (I am photographed, using hitpa'el) means something like I'm having my picture taken, implying that the picture does not exist yet, and that the speaker is causing the picture to be taken.

In other cases, hitpa'el verbs are ordinary intransitive verbs; for example, התנהג  (to behave), structurally is the reciprocal of נהג  (to act), as in נְהַג בְּחָכְמָה  (act wisely). However, it is used sparsely, only in sayings as such, and the more common meaning of nahaɡ is to drive; for that meaning, הִתְנַהֵג  is not a reciprocal form, but a separate verb in effect. For example: in talking about a car that drives itself, one would say מְכוֹנִית שֶׁנּוֹהֶגֶת אֶת עַצְמָהּ  (a car that drives itself, using nahag), not מְכוֹנִית שֶׁמִּתְנַהֶגֶת  (a car that behaves, using hitnaheg).

Nouns
The Hebrew noun (שֵׁם עֶצֶם ) is inflected for number and state, but not for case and therefore Hebrew nominal structure is normally not considered to be strictly declensional. Nouns are generally related to verbs (by shared roots), but their formation is not as systematic, often due to loanwords from foreign languages. Hebrew nouns are also inflected for definiteness by application of the prefix ַה (ha) before the given noun. Semantically, the prefix "ha" corresponds roughly to the English word "the".

Gender: masculine and feminine
Every noun in Hebrew has a gender, either masculine or feminine (or both); for example, סֵפֶר  (book) is masculine, דֶּלֶת  (door) is feminine, and סַכִּין  (knife) is both. There is no strict system of formal gender, but there is a tendency for nouns ending in ת or ה (usually ) to be feminine and for nouns ending in other letters to be masculine. There is a very strong tendency toward natural gender for nouns referring to people and some animals. Such nouns generally come in pairs, one masculine and one feminine; for example, אִישׁ  means man and אִשָּׁה  means woman. (When discussing mixed-sex groups, the plural of the masculine noun is used.)

Number: singular, plural, and dual
Hebrew nouns are inflected for grammatical number; as in English, count nouns have a singular form for referring to one object and a plural form for referring to more than one. Unlike in English, some count nouns also have separate dual forms, for referring to two objects; see below.

Masculine nouns generally form their plural by adding the suffix ים :
 מַחְשֵׁב  (computer) → מַחְשְׁבִים  (computers)

The addition of the extra syllable usually causes the vowel in the first syllable to shorten if it is Kamatz:
 דָּבָר  (thing) → דְּבָרִים  (things)

Many common two-syllable masculine nouns accented on the penultimate syllable (often called segolates, because many (but not all) of them have the vowel  in the last syllable), undergo more drastic characteristic vowel changes in the plural:
 יֶלֶד  (boy) → יְלָדִים  (boys, children)
 בֹּקֶר  (morning) → בְּקָרִים  (mornings)
 חֶדֶר  (room) → חֲדָרִים  (rooms)

 מִטָּה  (bed) → מִטּוֹת  (beds)
 מִסְעָדָה  (restaurant) → מִסְעָדוֹת  (restaurants)
 צַּלַּחַת  (plate) → צַלָּחוֹת  (plates)

 מַחְבֶּרֶת  (notebook) → מַחְבָּרוֹת  (notebooks)

 חֲנוּת  (store) → חֲנוּיוֹת  (stores)
 אֶשְׁכּוֹלִית  (grapefruit) → אֶשְׁכּוֹלִיּוֹת  (grapefruits)

Plural exceptions
A large number of masculine nouns take the usually feminine ending  in the plural:
 מָקוֹם  (place) → מְקוֹמוֹת  (places)
 חַלּוֹן  (window) → חַלּוֹנוֹת  (windows)

A small number of feminine nouns take the usually masculine ending :
 מִלָּה  (word) → מִלִּים  (words)
 שָׁנָה  (year) → שָׁנִים  (years)

Many plurals are completely irregular:
 עִיר  (city) → עָרִים  (cities)
 עִפָּרוֹן  (pencil) → עֶפְרוֹנוֹת  (pencils)
 אִישׁ  (man; root ʔ-I-) → אֲנָשִׁים  (men, people; root ʔ-N-ʃ)

Some forms, like אָחוֹת ← אֲחָיוֹת (sister) or חָמוֹת ← חֲמָיוֹת (mother-in-law) reflect the historical broken plurals of Proto-Semitic, which have been preserved in other Semitic languages (most notably Arabic)."Hebrew" by P. Kyle McCarter Jr. in The Cambridge Encyclopedia of the World's Ancient Languages edited by Roger D. Woodard (2004) , p. 342.

Dual
Hebrew also has a dual number, expressed in the ending , but even in ancient times its use was very restricted. In modern times, it is usually used in expressions of time and number, or items that are inherently dual. These nouns have plurals as well, which are used for numbers higher than two, for example:

The dual is also used for some body parts, for instance:
 רֶגֶל  (foot) → רַגְלַיִם  (feet)
 אֹזֶן  (ear) → אָזְנַיִם  (ears)
 עַיִן  (eye) → עֵינַיִם  (eyes)
 יָד  (hand) → יָדַיִם  (hands)

In this case, even if there are more than two, the dual is still used, for instance  ("a dog has four legs").

The dual is also used for certain objects that are "semantically" dual. These words have no singular, for instance משקפים  (eyeglasses) and מספרים  (scissors). As in the English "two pairs of pants", the plural of these words uses the word זוּג  (pair), e.g.  ("two pairs-of scissors-DUAL").

Similarly, the dual can be found in some place names, such as the city גִּבְעָתַיִם  (Twin Peaks, referring to the two hills of the landscape on which the city is built) and the country מִצְרַיִם /mit͡sˈrajim/ (Egypt, related to the ancient conceptualization of Egypt as two realms: Upper Egypt and Lower Egypt). However, both the city name and country name are actually grammatically treated as feminine singular nouns, as the words עיר /ʕir/ for city and מדינה /mediˈna/ for country are both feminine.

Noun construct
In Hebrew, as in English, a noun can modify another noun. This is achieved by placing the modifier immediately after what it modifies, in a construction called סְמִיכוּת  (adjacency). The noun being modified appears in its construct form, or status constructus. For most nouns, the construct form is derived fairly easily from the normal (indefinite) form:
 The singular of a masculine noun typically does not change form.
 The plural of a masculine noun typically replaces the suffix ים-  with the suffix י- .
 The singular of a feminine noun ending in ה-  typically replaces that ה with a ת .
 The plural of a feminine noun typically does not change form.

There are many words (usually ancient ones) that have changes in vocalization in the construct form. However, these two forms are written the same without niqquds.

In addition, the definite article is never placed on the first noun (the one in the construct form).
 בֵּית סֵפֶר  (literally, house-of book or bookhouse, i.e. school)
 בֵּית הַסֵּפֶר  (literally, house-of the-book, i.e. the school)
 בָּתֵּי חוֹלִים  (literally, houses-of sick-people, i.e. hospitals)
 עוּגַת הַשּׁוֹקוֹלָד  (the chocolate cake)
 דֹּאַר אֲוִיר  (air mail)
 כֶּלֶב רְחוֹב  (street dog)
 בַּקְבּוּק הֶחָלָב  (the bottle of milk)

However, this rule is not always adhered to in informal or colloquial speech; one finds, for example, הָעוֹרֵךְ דִּין  (literally the law organiser, i.e. lawyer).

Possession
Possession is generally indicated using the preposition של , roughly meaning of or belonging to:
 הַסֵּפֶר שֶׁלִּי  (literally the-book of-me, i.e. my book)
 הַדִּירָה שֶׁלְּךָ  (literally the-apartment of-you, i.e. your apartment, single masculine form)
 הַמִּשְׂחָק שֶׁל אֶנְדֶּר  (literally the-game of-Ender, i.e. Ender's Game)

In literary style, nouns are inflected to show possession through noun declension; a personal suffix is added to the construct form of the noun (discussed above). So, סִפְרֵי  (books of) can be inflected to form סְפָרַי  (my books),סְפָרֶיךָ  (your books, singular masculine form), סְפָרֵינוּ  (our books), and so forth, while דִּירַת  (apartment of) gives דִּירָתִי  (my apartment), דִּירַתְךָ  (your apartment; singular masculine form),דִּירָתֵנוּ  (our apartment), etc.

While the use of these forms is mostly restricted to formal and literary speech, they are in regular use in some colloquial phrases, such as ?מָה שְׁלוֹמְךָ  (literally "what peace-of-you?", i.e. "what is your peace?", i.e. "how are you?", singular masculine form) or לְדַעֲתִי  (in my opinion/according to my knowledge).

In addition, the inflected possessive is commonly used for terms of kinship; for instance, בְּנִי  (my son), בִּתָּם  (their daughter), and אִשְׁתּוֹ  (his wife) are preferred to הַבֵּן שֶׁלִּי , הַבַּת שֶׁלָּהֶם , and הָאִשָּׁה שֶׁלּוֹ . However, usage differs for different registers and sociolects: In general, the colloquial will use more analytic constructs in place of noun declensions.

Noun derivation
In the same way that Hebrew verbs are conjugated by applying various prefixes, suffixes and internal vowel combinations, Hebrew nouns can be formed by applying various "meters" (Hebrew ) and suffixes to the same roots. Gerunds, as indicated above, are one example.

Many abstract nouns are derived from noun, using the suffix :
 סֵפֶר  (book) → סִפְרוּת  (literature)

Also, there is הִתְקַטְּלוּת  meter, that also ends with :
 הִתְיַעֵץ  (to consult) → הִתְיַעֲצוּת  (consultation)
 הִתְרַגֵּשׁ  (to get excited) → הִתְרַגְּשׁוּת  (excitement)

The קַטְלָן  meter applied to a root, and the  suffix applied to a noun, indicate an agent or job:
 שֶׁקֶר  (lie) (root: ש-ק-ר ʃ-q-r) → שַׁקְרָן  (liar)
 פַּחַד  (fear) (root: פ-ח-ד p-ħ-d) → פַּחְדָן  (coward)
 חָלָב  (milk) → חַלְבָן  (milkman)
 סֵדֶר  (order) → סַדְרָן  (usher)

The suffix  usually denotes a diminutive:
 מִטְבָּח  (kitchen) → מִטְבָּחוֹן  (kitchenette)
 סֵפֶר  (book) → סִפְרוֹן  (booklet)
 מַחְשֵׁב  (computer) → מַחְשְׁבוֹן  (calculator)

Though occasionally this same suffix can denote an augmentative:
 חֲנָיָה  (parking space) → חַנְיוֹן  (parking lot)
 קֶרַח  (ice) → קַרְחוֹן  (glacier)

Repeating the last two letters of a noun or adjective can also denote a diminutive:
 כֶּלֶב  (dog) → כְּלַבְלַב  (puppy)
 קָצָר  (short) → קְצַרְצַר  (very short)

The קָטֶּלֶת meter commonly used to name diseases:
 אָדֹם  (red) → אַדֶּמֶת  (rubella)
 כֶּלֶב  (dog) → כַּלֶּבֶת  (rabies)
 צָהֹב  (yellow) → צַהֶבֶת  (jaundice, more colloquially hepatitis)

However, it can have various different meanings as well:
 נְיָר  (paper) → נַיֶּרֶת  (paperwork)
 כֶּסֶף  (money) → כַּסֶּפֶת  (a safe)

New nouns are also often formed by the combination of two existing stems:
 קוֹל  (sound) + נוֹעַ  (motion) → קוֹלְנוֹע  (cinema)
 רֶמֶז  (hint) + אוֹר  (light) → רַמְזוֹר  (traffic light)
 קְנִיָּה  (purchase) + חַנְיוֹן  (parking lot) → קַנְיוֹן  (shopping mall)
רַמְזוֹר  uses more strictly recent compound conventions, as the א aleph (today usually silent but historically very specifically a glottal stop) is dropped entirely from spelling and pronunciation of the compound.

Some nouns use a combination of methods of derivation:
 תּוֹעֶלֶת  (benefit) → תוֹעַלְתָּנוּת  (Utilitarianism) (suffix  followed by suffix )
 קֹמֶץ  (handful) → קַמְצָן  (miser, miserly) → קַמְצָנוּת  (miserliness) (suffix  followed by suffix )

Adjectives
In Hebrew, an adjective (שֵׁם תֹּאַר ) agrees in gender, number, and definiteness with the noun it modifies. Attributive adjectives follow the nouns they modify.
 סֵפֶר קָטָן  (a small book)
 סְפָרִים קְטַנִּים  (small books)
 בֻּבָּה קְטַנָּה  (a small doll)
 בֻּבּוֹת קְטַנּוֹת  (small dolls)

Adjectives ending in -i have slightly different forms:
 אִישׁ מְקוֹמִי  (a local man)
 אִשָּׁה מְקוֹמִית  (a local woman)
 אֲנָשִׁים מְקוֹמִיִּים  (local people)
 נָשִׁים מְקוֹמִיּוֹת  (local women)

Masculine nouns that take the feminine plural ending  still take masculine plural adjectives, e.g. מְקוֹמוֹת יָפִים  (beautiful places).

Many adjectives, like segolate nouns, change their vowel structure in the feminine and plural.

Use of the definite article with adjectives
In Hebrew, an attributive adjective takes the definite article if it modifies a definite noun (either a proper noun, or a definite common noun):
 הַמְּכוֹנִית הַחֲדָשָׁה הָאֲדֻמָּה הַמְּהִירָה  (The new, red, fast car, lit. The car the new the red the fast (f.sing.))
 דָּוִד הַגָּדוֹל  (David the Great, lit. David the-great (m.sing.))

Adjectives derived from verbs
Many adjectives in Hebrew are derived from the present tense of verbs. These adjectives are inflected the same way as the verbs they are derived from:
 סוֹעֵר  (stormy, paʕal) → סוֹעֶרֶת , סוֹעֲרִים , סוֹעֲרוֹת 
 מְנֻתָּק  (alienated, puʕal) → מְנֻתֶּקֶת , מְנֻתָּקִים , מְנֻתָּקוֹת 
 מַרְשִׁים  (impressive, hifʕil) → מַרְשִׁימָה , מַרְשִׁימִים , מַרְשִׁימוֹת

Adverbs
The Hebrew term for adverb is תֹּאַר הַפֹּעַל .

Hebrew forms adverbs in several different ways.

Some adjectives have corresponding one-word adverbs. In many cases, the adverb is simply the adjective's masculine singular form:
 חָזָק  (strong or strongly)
 בָּרוּר  (clear or clearly)
In other cases, the adverb has a distinct form:
 מַהֵר  (quickly; from the adjective מָהִיר , quick)
 לְאַט  (slowly; from the adjective אִטִּי , slow)
 הֵיטֵב  (well; from the adjective טוֹב , good)

In some cases, an adverb is derived from an adjective using its singular feminine form or (mostly in poetic or archaic usage) its plural feminine form:
 אוֹטוֹמָטִית  (automatically)
 קַלּוֹת  (lightly)

Most adjectives, however, do not have corresponding one-word adverbs; rather, they have corresponding adverb phrases, formed using one of the following approaches:
 using the prepositional prefix ב  (in) with the adjective's corresponding abstract noun:
 בִּזְהִירוּת  ("in carefulness": carefully)
 בַּעֲדִינוּת  ("in fineness": finely)
 using the same prefix, but with the noun אֹפֶן  (means/fashion), and modifying the noun with the adjective's masculine singular form:
 בְּאֹפֶן אִטִּי  ("in slow fashion": slowly).
 similarly, but with the noun צוּרָה  (like/shape), and using the adjective's feminine singular form:
 בְּצוּרָה אָפְיָנִית  ("in characteristic form": characteristically).

The use of one of these methods does not necessarily preclude the use of the others; for example, slowly may be either לְאַט  (a one-word adverb), בְּאִטִּיּוּת  (literally "in slowness", a somewhat more elegant way of expressing the same thing) or בְּאֹפֶן אִטִּי  ("in slow fashion"), as mentioned above.

Finally, as in English, there are various adverbs that do not have corresponding adjectives at all:
 לָכֵן  (therefore)
 כָּכָה  (thus)

Prepositions
Like English, Hebrew is primarily a prepositional language, with a large number of prepositions. Several of Hebrew's most common prepositions are prefixes rather than separate words. For example, English in a room is Hebrew בְּחֶדֶר . These prefixes precede the definite prefix ה, which assimilates to them: the room is הַחֶדֶר ; in the room is בַּחֶדֶר .

Direct objects

The preposition אֶת  plays an important role in Hebrew grammar. Its most common use is to introduce a direct object; for example, English I see the book is in Hebrew אֲנִי רוֹאֶה אֶת הַסֵּפֶר  (literally I see  the-book). However, אֶת /ʔet/ is used only with semantically definite direct objects, such as nouns with the, proper nouns, and personal pronouns; with semantically indefinite direct objects, it is simply omitted: אֲנִי רוֹאֶה סֵפֶר ʔani roʔe sefer (I see a book) does not use את /ʔet/. This has no direct translation into English, and is best described as an object particle — that is, it denotes that the word it precedes is the direct object of the verb.

This preposition has a number of special uses. For example, when the adjective צָרִיךְ  (in need (of)) takes a definite noun complement, it uses the preposition אֶת /ʔet/: הָיִיתִי צָרִיךְ אֶת זֶה  (literally I-was in-need-of  this, i.e. I needed this). Here as elsewhere, the אֶת  is dropped with an indefinite complement: הָיוּ צְרִיכִים יוֹתֵר  (literally they-were in-need-of more, i.e. they needed more). This is perhaps related to the verb-like fashion in which the adjective is used.

In Biblical Hebrew, there is possibly another use of /ʔet/. Waltke and O'Connor (pp. 177–178) make the point: "...(1) ...sign of the accusative... (2) More recent grammarians regard it as a marker of emphasis used most often with definite nouns in the accusative role. The apparent occurrences with the nominative are most problematic... AM Wilson late in the nineteenth century concluded from his exhaustive study of all the occurrences of the debated particle that it had an intensive or reflexive force in some of its occurrences. Many grammarians have followed his lead. (reference lists studies of 1955, 1964, 1964, 1973, 1965, 1909, 1976.) On such a view, /ʔet/ is a weakened emphatic particle corresponding to the English pronoun 'self'... It resembles Greek 'autos' and Latin 'ipse' both sometimes used for emphasis, and like them it can be omitted from the text, without obscuring the grammar. This explanation of the particle's meaning harmonizes well with the facts that the particle is used in Mishnaic Hebrew as a demonstrative and is found almost exclusively with determinate nouns."

Pronominal suffix
There is a form called the verbal pronominal suffix, in which a direct object can be rendered as an additional suffix onto the verb. This form allows for a high degree of word economy, as the single fully conjugated verb expresses the verb, its voice, its subject, its object, and its tense.
 שְׁמַרְנוּהוּ  (we protected him)

In modern usage, the verbal pronominal suffixes are rarely used, in favor of expression of direct objects as the inflected form of the separate word ʔet. It is used more commonly in biblical and poetic Hebrew (for instance, in prayers).

Indirect objects
Indirect objects are objects requiring a preposition other than אֶת . The preposition used depends on the verb, and these can be very different from the one used in English. In the case of definite indirect objects, the preposition will replace את .
 שָׁכַחְתִּי מֵהַבְּחִירוֹת  (I forgot about the election)

Hebrew grammar distinguishes between various kinds of indirect objects, according to what they specify. Thus, there is a division between objects for time תֵּאוּר זְמַן, objects for place תֵּאוּר מָקוֹם, objects for reason תֵּאוּר סִבָּה and many others.

In Hebrew, there are no distinct prepositional pronouns. If the object of a preposition is a pronoun, the preposition contracts with the object yielding an inflected preposition.
 דִּבַּרְנוּ עִם דָּוִד  (we spoke with David)
 דִּבַּרְנוּ אִתּוֹ  (we spoke with him)
(The preposition עִם  (with) in everyday speech is not inflected, rather a different, more archaic pronoun אֶת  with the same meaning, unrelated to the direct object marker, is used instead.)

Inflected prepositions

See also
 Hebrew verb conjugation
 Prefixes in Hebrew
 Suffixes in Hebrew
 Hebrew spelling

References

Bibliography
Modern Hebrew
 
 
 
 

Biblical Hebrew

External links
 
 Hebrew Verbs Conjugation Tool - Online Hebrew Verb Learning Tool (Hebrew/English)
 Modern Hebrew learning resources
 Online Hebrew Course with Audio
 Glamour of the Grammar – Hebraist Dr. Joel M. Hoffman's biweekly column on Hebrew grammar
 Foundationstone — Online Hebrew Tutorial
 A Basic Introduction to Hebrew grammar
 History of the Ancient and Modern Hebrew Language, David Steinberg